The teams competing in Group 2 of the 2009 UEFA European Under-21 Championships qualifying competition are Armenia, Czech Republic, Liechtenstein, Turkey and Ukraine.

Standings

Key:
Pts Points, Pld Matches played, W Won, D Drawn, L Lost, GF Goals for, GA Goals against, GD Goal Difference

Matches

Goalscorers

1 goal
: Artak Andrikyan, Hayk Chilingaryan, Karlen Mkrtchyan, Semion Muradyan, Gevorg Nranyan, Vardan Petrosyan
: Martin Fillo, Ondřej Mazuch, František Rajtoral
: Stefan Buchel, Mathias Christen
: Ediz Bahtiyaroğlu, Abdullah Durak, Mevlüt Erdinç, Zafer Yelen, Eren Güngör, Özer Hurmacı
: Ruslan Fomin, Konstantyn Kravchenko, Dmytro Lopa, Volodymyr Lysenko
Own goals
: Oleksandr Chyzhov

Group 2
Under